Ulla is a given name. It is short for Ursula in German-speaking countries and Ulrika/Ulrikke in Scandinavian countries. As of 31 December 2011, there were 61,043 females named Ulla in Sweden, with the name being most popular during the 1930s and 40s, and as of 7 June 2010, there were 25,959 females named Ulla in Finland, most born between 1940 and 1979.

People

Pre-20th century
 Ulla (Talmudist) (3rd-4th centuries AD), a rabbi mentioned in the Talmud
 Ulla Adlerfelt (1736–1765), Swedish painter and noble, member of the Royal Swedish Academy of Arts
 Ulla von Höpken (1749–1810), Swedish lady-in-waiting, leading socialite and noble
 Ulrika Pasch (1735–1796), Swedish painter and miniaturist also known as Ulla Pasch
 Johanna Ulrica Ulla Stenberg (1792–1858), Swedish damask maker
 Ulla Tessin (1711–1768), Swedish lady-in-waiting, letter writer, dilettante artist and countess, relative of Ulla von Höpken

Modern period
 Ulla Andersson (born 1946), Swedish former high fashion model and ex-wife of music producer Quincy Jones
 Ulla Andersson (politician) (born 1963), Swedish politician
 Ulla Anttila (born 1963), Finnish politician
 Ursula Ulla Burchardt (born 1954), German politician
 Ulla Dinger (born 1955), Swedish mathematician
 Ulla Essendrop (born 1976), Danish television presenter
 Ulla Hahn (born 1946), German poet and novelist
 Ulla Håkansson (born 1937), Swedish equestrian and Olympic medalist
 Ulla Hoffmann (born 1942), Swedish politician
 Ulla Isaksson (1916–2000), Swedish author and screenplay writer
 Ulla Jacobsson (1929–1982), Swedish actress
 Ursula Ulla Jelpke (born 1951), German journalist and politician
 Ulla Jürß (born 1923), German concentration camp guard convicted of war crimes
 Ulla Engeberg Killias (1945–1995), Swedish-born painter
 Ulla Lindkvist (1939–2015) Swedish orienteering competitor, first individual female world champion
 Ulla Lindström (1909–1999), Swedish journalist and politician, first woman acting Prime Minister of Sweden
 Ulla Lock (1934–2012), Danish film actress
 Ulla Löfgren (born 1943), Swedish politician
 Ulla Mitzdorf (1944–2013), German scientist in diverse fields
 Ulla Orring (born 1926), Swedish politician
 Ulla Pirttijärvi (born 1971), Sami joik singer from Angeli, Finland
 Ulla Poulsen (1905–2001), Danish ballerina and actress
 Ulla Preeden (born 1980), Estonian geologist, academic and politician
 Ulla Saar (born 1975), Estonian illustrator, product designer, graphic artist, and interior designer
 Ulla Salzgeber (born 1958), German equestrian and Olympic (team) champion
 Ulla Sandbæk (born 1943), Danish politician
 Ursula Ulla Schmidt (born 1949), German politician, former Federal Minister for Health
 Ulla Sjöblom (1927–1989), Swedish film actress
 Ulla Strand (1943–2007), Danish badminton player, member of the Badminton Hall of Fame
 Ulla Strömstedt (1939–1986), Swedish-born actress
 Ulla Tørnæs (born 1962), Danish politician, former Minister for Education and former Minister for Development Cooperation of Denmark
 Ulla Trenter (1936–2019), Swedish author
 Ulla Vuorela (1945–2011), Finnish professor of social anthropology
 Ulla Weigerstorfer (born 1967), Austrian Miss World pageant winner in 1987
 Ulla Werbrouck (born 1972), Belgian politician and Olympic judo champion
 Ulla Wester (born 1953), Swedish politician

Biblical figures
 Ulla, an Asherite mentioned in 1 Chronicles 7:39 in the Bible

Fictional characters
 Ulla (The Producers), in Mel Brooks' film and musical The Producers
 Ulla Winblad, in many of Carl Michael Bellman's works

References

Feminine given names
Hypocorisms
Danish feminine given names
Estonian feminine given names
Finnish feminine given names
Scandinavian feminine given names
Swedish feminine given names